The 1985 Rothmans Four-Nations Cup was held in Sharjah, UAE, between March 22–29, 1985. Four national teams took part: Australia, England, India and Pakistan.

The 1985 Rothmans Four-Nations Cup was a knock-out tournament. India won the tournament, defeating Australia in the final, and won US$45,000. Pakistan beat England in the Plate Final to take third place.

Matches

Semi-finals

Plate Final (third place play-off)

Final

See also
 Sharjah Cup

References

 
 Cricket Archive: Rothmans Four-Nations Cup 1984/85
 CricInfo: Rothmans Four-Nations Cup, 1984/85
 Wisden Cricketers' Almanack 1986: Rothmans Trophy in Sharjah, 1984-85

International cricket competitions from 1980–81 to 1985
Rothmans Four-Nations Cup, 1985
1985 in Emirati sport
International cricket competitions in the United Arab Emirates